James Stevenson (2 February 1881 – 1946) was a Scottish footballer who played as an inside forward and was active in the early 20th century. He made six appearances in The Football League for Nottingham Forest and also played for Gillingham. In Scotland he had two spells with Morton, the second of which included loans to Abercorn and Port Glasgow Athletic.

References

1881 births
1946 deaths
Scottish footballers
Abercorn F.C. players
Association football inside forwards
Date of death missing
English Football League players
Gillingham F.C. players
Greenock Morton F.C. players
Nottingham Forest F.C. players
Place of birth missing
Place of death missing
Port Glasgow Athletic F.C. players
Scottish Football League players